Martha Jean Lambert (born March 26, 1973) was a 12-year-old Florida girl who went missing on November 27, 1985. She has never been seen again and foul play is highly suspected in the case.

Life prior to disappearance 
Martha was born to Howard and Margaret Lambert on March 26, 1973. She was described as a kind and shy girl who loved to spend time at friends' houses. However, Martha's life was not perfect. Her father Howard was an alcoholic and his temper was explosive, her mother was often fighting with Howard, and her two brothers were strange. Due to unknown reasons, possibly child abuse, Martha and her brothers spent much of their young lives in foster care and many different homes. Despite Martha's small stature, she was known to be a force to be reckoned with. Martha was the peacekeeper between her two older brothers and got along with them. Martha enjoyed spending time with her mother, who referred to Martha as her "best friend." Martha enjoyed attending church; she had poor grades at the time, but liked school. Martha liked to eat fried potatoes and spaghetti, liked country music, and liked soccer. Martha loved her family and was excited for Thanksgiving of 1985 because she would be spending the day with her family at her grandmother's house.

Disappearance
Martha, a 7th grader, was last seen on November 27, 1985. She attended her classes at Ketterlinus Junior High School that day and when school concluded, she went to a friend's residence for some time afterward. She then left the friend's house to return to her own home on Kerri Lynn Road in St. Augustine at approximately 7:30 pm. Whatever happened afterward is not clear, as her family gave varying stories of events that night. Martha was reported missing at 3:00 am on November 28 when no one could find her. Martha is described as a Caucasian female, with blonde hair and blue eyes. She stood approximately 4 feet 5 inches and weighed 70 pounds. She has birthmarks on her upper left chest and on the front of her right thigh, her top front teeth slightly protrude. Martha was last known to be wearing a short sleeved summer dress and/or a two piece matching bathing suit.

Investigation
Authorities started to search for Martha immediately following her disappearance. Areas along State Road 207 and areas in Kerri Lynn Road were searched. Nothing was found and the case started to turn cold. They never gave up hope of finding the girl. Since the day she vanished, Martha's mother believed that she was kidnapped and taken from the area. According to her, on the night of Martha's disappearance, she and her daughter were at a social gathering when Martha said "Mom, I'm going over, I’ll be back in five minutes.” She left the gathering and never returned. When Margaret noticed that a substantial amount of time passed and Martha hadn't returned, she went out looking for her. She reported her missing later on.

Authorities questioned everyone in the area. Some neighbors stated that they had seen Martha walking West on Kerri Lynn Road later that night. Others also reported that they had seen a suspicious green van being driven in the area. It was the only vehicle that was not native to the area. It was apparently spotted soon after Martha left. Her brother, David Lambert, gave varying stories as to what occurred that night. He once stated that he saw Martha getting into a black vehicle. Authorities said the story did not hold up. He would then go on to state that he and Martha were having dinner that night when Martha said she was going out. When he asked where, she told him it was none of his concern and she refused to divulge her destination. She left and David watched as Martha walked off into the dark. Martha's case was initially considered a runaway but authorities believe that Martha met with foul play and was likely deceased.

Abduction theory
Many, including Martha's mother, believed that the girl was abducted by a non-family member while outside. Authorities also suspected this and have investigated the possibility of a stranger abduction with great lengths but no clues emerged despite extensive searches and investigations. No one was ever named as her kidnapper and no one has ever been arrested in connection with her disappearance. Several possible suspects have been named in the case but there was no evidence in the case to prove that they had anything to do with her disappearance. Margaret Ann Lambert also remains hopeful that her daughter may still be alive. Many agencies online continue to classify Martha as a Non-Family Abduction case.

David Lambert
David Allen Lambert, the middle child of the Lambert family, has always been mentioned in the case. He has given many varying statements to police over the years regarding his sister's disappearance. He at one point stated that Martha was alive and had contacted him and was going to contact the authorities working on her case. This never occurred. Investigators have always had the belief that David was hiding something and that he knew more about Martha's disappearance than he let on. He was approximately fourteen years old in 1985.

The confession
In 2000, when David was arrested for attempting to pass a bad check, he told authorities that he was responsible for Martha's death and stated he buried her in a coquina mine known as "The Pitts" on Holmes Boulevard. The mine was searched but investigators did not find Martha's body. He could not be charged at that time due to lack of evidence.

In 2009, he confessed again to killing Martha. He stated that on November 27, 1985, he and Martha left the Lambert home because their parents got into a fight over burned turkey. They went to a Lil Champs convenience store; David apparently had over $20 with him. Martha spent a little over $4 and gave him the change. He then stated that he and Martha went to the abandoned Florida Memorial College which was near the Lambert residence to play. David stated that he and Martha got into a fight because he denied Martha's request for another $20. Martha slapped David across the face and in response he pushed her. He pushed her so hard the she fell onto the ground and hit her head on a piece of metal. When David realized what had happened, he pulled Martha up and noticed a large hole in the back of her head and blood was pouring out. He called for help, hoping someone would come and help the girl. No one apparently heard him. David was scared of what his parents would do to him if they discovered what he had done to Martha, so by using the broken piece of a road sign, he dug a 3-foot makeshift grave and placed Martha in the hole. He returned home.

Aftermath

Authorities were certain that David was telling the truth about his sister's death. He was not charged with manslaughter due to his age at the time of Martha's death and because the statute of limitations had expired by then. Martha's case was closed, but authorities have stated that the investigation can be reopened if new information comes in. Martha's mother remains convinced that Martha was kidnapped and has stated that David often tells tales to get attention. David later recanted his confession and stated he did not know what happened to Martha. He stated that he has long-standing emotional and mental problems. He's also mentioned the possibility that Martha could still be alive. Investigators and forensic teams spent two days searching the grounds where the college once stood but could not find Martha's body. Construction and demolition of the area in the years since her disappearance may have moved the grave. Martha has never been recovered. Authorities hope to find her and have since collected DNA samples and entered them into NamUs. Her dental records have also been coded and entered into national databases. There is still hope that Martha's case can be solved and that she can be recovered.

See also
List of people who disappeared

References

1980s missing person cases
1985 in Florida
Missing American children
Missing person cases in Florida
People from St. Augustine, Florida